Sieroniowice  is a village in the administrative district of Gmina Ujazd, within Strzelce County, Opole Voivodeship, in south-western Poland.

The village has a population of 640.

Gallery

External links 
 Jewish Community in Sieroniowice on Virtual Shtetl

References

Sieroniowice